Greenham is a surname. Notable people with the surname include:

Chris Greenham (1923–1989), English sound editor
Dave Greenham (1889–1945), Australian rules footballer
Fiona Greenham (born 1976), British field hockey player
Richard Greenham (1535?–1594?), English clergyman